Gina Annette Cole  (born 1960) is a New Zealand writer and lawyer. Her writing is inspired by her experiences as a queer Fijian woman. Her short story collection Black Ice Matter received the award for best first book of fiction at the 2017 Ockham New Zealand Book Awards. Her first novel Na Viro was published in July 2022.

Background and education
Cole was born in 1960. She is of Fijian, Scottish and Welsh descent. From 1963 to 1966 she and her family lived on Farewell Spit, where her father was the lighthouse keeper.  she lives in Auckland. She studied law at the University of Auckland and was admitted to the bar in 1991. She practiced as a barrister until 2018, when she closed her practice to focus on her writing.

In 2013 Cole obtained a Masters in Creative Writing from the University of Auckland, and in 2020 earned a PhD in Creative Writing from Massey University on the topic of indigenous science fiction. She has said that as "an Indigenous Fijian queer woman writer I feel it is so important that we Indigenous peoples tell our own stories so that we can put forward our perspective and experience". In 2014 she won a writing contest at the Auckland Pride Festival run by Express magazine.

Writing career
In 2017 Cole's short story collection Black Ice Matter received the award for best first book of fiction at the Ockham New Zealand Book Awards. A review by Stuff said that the collection "would be a good book on any reckoning but as a first book it is simply outstanding"; it "shows an assurance of tone, a clarity of style and expression, and an ability to handle different voices, that would be the envy of most more experienced authors". She also had an essay published in the collection New Writing edited by Thom Conroy, and a short story published in Black Marks on the White Page edited by Witi Ihimaera and Tina Makereti. In 2021 she was a writer-in-residence at the Michael King Writers Centre through a residency for established Pasifika writers, and had work published in the anthology Out Here: An Anthology of Takatapui and LGBTQIA+ Writers from Aotearoa New Zealand edited by Chris Tse and Emma Barnes.

In July 2022 Cole's first novel Na Viro was published. It is a science fiction novel set in the distant future and featuring Pacific culture. In the week before 15 July 2022 it was the second-best selling fiction book in New Zealand. A review in the New Zealand Listener described it as an "ambitious book", "at the forefront of a new and particularly interesting genre", but noted that the book was challenging to read in some respects, with the story lacking "a single emotional centre and ... some much-needed explanation of things both futuristic and mundane". In the same month she received the inaugural International Residency with Australia, a partnership between the Michael King Writers Centre and Varuna, The Writers' House. She received a month's residency at Varuna, to be taken up in October 2022, and an appearance at the Blue Mountains Writers' Festival.

In the 2023 New Year Honours, Cole was appointed a Member of the New Zealand Order of Merit, for services to literature.

Selected works
 Black Ice Matter (Huia Publishers, 2016)
 Na Viro (Huia Publishers, 2022)

References

External links
 Short story: Sunset on Mars, by Gina Cole on Newsroom
 Circling Back, article by Cole about her life on The Pantograph Punch, 8 July 2021
 "How I write: Gina Cole", article for Stuff, 26 October 2022

1960 births
Living people
New Zealand people of Fijian descent
21st-century New Zealand novelists
21st-century New Zealand women writers
21st-century New Zealand short story writers
University of Auckland alumni
Massey University alumni
Fijian women writers
21st-century Fijian writers
New Zealand women lawyers
Fijian women lawyers
20th-century Fijian lawyers
21st-century Fijian lawyers
20th-century New Zealand lawyers
21st-century New Zealand lawyers
New Zealand LGBT novelists
Fijian LGBT people
Members of the New Zealand Order of Merit